The men's 1500 metres was the third-longest of the seven men's track races in the Athletics at the 1964 Summer Olympics program in Tokyo.  It was held on 17 October, 19 October, and 21 October 1964. 50 athletes from 34 nations entered, with 7 not starting the first round. The maximum number of athletes per nation had been set at 3 since the 1930 Olympic Congress. The first round was held on 17 October, with the semifinals on 19 October and the final on 21 October. 

The event was won by Peter Snell of New Zealand; it was the first win by a Kiwi in the event since Jack Lovelock did so in 1936. Snell was also the first man to double in the 800 and 1500 metres races since Albert Hill in 1920. John Davies took bronze, making the first time in any event that New Zealand had two medalists in the same competition.

Background

This was the 15th appearance of the event, which is one of 12 athletics events to have been held at every Summer Olympics. Only two finalists, and no medalists, from 1960 returned: sixth-place finisher Dyrol Burleson of the United States and seventh-place finisher Michel Bernard of France. Silver medalist Michel Jazy of France was entered, but did not start. The favorite was Peter Snell of New Zealand, who had won the 800 metres in 1960 and again in 1964 (with the 800 metres final a day before the 1500 metres first round), as well as breaking the one-mile world record in 1962.

Chad, Hong Kong, Iran, the Ivory Coast, Jamaica, Kenya, and Malaysia each made their first appearance in the event. The United States made its 15th appearance, the only nation to have competed in the men's 1500 metres at each Games to that point.

Competition format

The competition expanded again to three rounds (used previously in 1952, the only prior exception to the two-round format that had been in place since 1908). The 1964 competition introduced the "fastest loser" system, used only in the semifinals at this edition. Previously, advancement depended solely on the runners' place in their heat. The 1964 competition added advancement places to the fastest runners across the heats in the semifinals who did not advance based on place. There were four heats with 12 or 13 runners each (before withdrawals), with the top four runners in each and the next two fastest overall advancing to the semifinals. These 18 semifinalists ran in two heats of 9 men each, with the top four in each heat and the faster of the two fifth-place finishers advancing to the final (a 9-man final, down from 12, had first been used in 1960).

Records

These were the standing world and Olympic records prior to the 1964 Summer Olympics.

No new world or Olympic records were set during the competition.

Schedule

All times are Japan Standard Time (UTC+9)

Results

First round

The top four runners in each of the 4 heats advanced, as well as the next two fastest runners from across all heats.

Heat 1

Heat 2

Heat 3

Heat 4

Semifinals

The fastest four runners in each of the two semifinals and the fastest remaining runner qualified for the final.

Semifinal 1

Semifinal 2

Final

World and Olympic record holder, Herb Elliott was not back to defend his title, having retired from the sport at 24 years of age.  1960 800 metre champion Peter Snell entered the Olympics with the intent of duplicating his feat, doubling over similar distances at the previous 1962 Commonwealth Games.  He had already lowered Elliott's mile world record by a tick two years earlier.  Snell had already successfully defended his 800 metre title.

As had been his typical strategy, Snell chose to stay in a marking position behind the leaders.  Splits were recorded at 400 metres, 800 metres, and 1200 metres.  Michel Bernard led after the first lap, Josef Odložil and John Davies were in front after two.  Wary of being boxed in as he was in the 1960 Olympic 800, at the bell his countryman Davies held the lead while Snell was boxed in by Dyrol Burleson.  He slowed then decisively moved to the outside to be in a position to run.  Others were also scrambling for position, Witold Baran made his move and had the lead at the end of the third lap but Davies again assumed the lead down the backstretch.  With about 220 metres to go, Snell accelerated, blowing past Baran and Davies, the others would now be racing for second place.  Snell extended his lead to almost 10 metres, crossing the finish line 1.5 seconds ahead of anyone else.  Through the turn, Alan Simpson got around Davies and Baran, behind them Burleson was moving to the outside.  Even further back, Odložil began his final sprint around the outside of Burleson.  Davies was able to get barely ahead of Simpson, holding him off at the finish line but that would only be for bronze as Odložil came roaring down the home stretch, catching both before the finish to grab silver.

References

Athletics at the 1964 Summer Olympics
1500 metres at the Olympics
Men's events at the 1964 Summer Olympics